Anatra was an aircraft manufacturer founded by Artur Antonovich Anatra at Odessa, Ukraine, then Russian Empire in 1913 which manufactured aircraft until 1917. Artur Anatra had previously helped fund the purchase of the first aircraft to arrive in the Russian Empire, in 1909.

The factory began as a naval workshop producing foreign designs, and they constructed approximately twenty aircraft from 1909 through 1912. Anatra licensed designs by Farman, Morane-Saulnier, Nieuport, and Voisin, ultimately building at a rate of as many as sixty per month by 1917.

Aircraft

Anatra started by producing foreign designs under license including the Farman III, Nieuport IV, Morane-Saulnier L, and Voisin V. The latter became the most significant of these, forming the basis for the Anatra V.I. (short for Voisin-Ivanovich) which flew in April 1916.

By then, their head designer, Frenchman Alfred Descamps, and who had previously worked for Aviatik before the outbreak of World War One, had completed development of the D Anade (D for Descamos, and Anade being short for Anatra-Descamps), commonly called the Dekan, following the Russian pronunciation of his surname, which would be the most numerous aircraft produced by Anatra. After an extended development period in which the crew had to be moved forward, and the wing moved aft and given substantial sweepback to correct balance problems, it saw service as a reconnaissance aircraft with the Imperial Russian Air Force (IRAS) and would be further developed. Due to shortages of good quality lumber, the factory scarfed shorter pieces together poorly, compromising its structural integrity, and giving Anatra a poor reputation with the IRAS.

Variants included the Anakle (short for Anade-Clerget), which was basically the same but powered by a  Clerget 9Z rotary engine installed under a horseshow cowling, which resulted in a modest performance improvement, and the  DS Anasal (short for Anade Salmson), powered with a  water-cooled Salmson 9R radial, which necessitated a redesign of the fuselage to handle the extra power so that the fabric covered rear fuselage was now covered in plywood, and it had the visible addition of a radiator for the engine. The DSS or Anasal SS followed and was similar to the DS, but with a slightly more powerful  Salmson radial, but few were built. All of these were reconnaissance aircraft. 

Anatra also developed two fighters. The first was the DM or Anamon single-seat monoplane with a wooden monocoque fuselage (that might have inspired its name) that resembled the pre-war Deperdussin TT. Armament was a single Vickers machine gun with deflector plates on the propellers instead of an interrupter gear, and power was provided by a  Gnome Monosoupape rotary engine. This aircraft was heavily criticized, and development ended following the crash of the single prototype shortly after its first flight on 16 June 1916.

The second fighter, the Anadis (short for Anade istrebitel, Russian for fighter) used Anasal flying surfaces with a new moulded wooden monocoque fuselage and was powered with a  Hispano-Suiza 8A engine and provided with enough fuel for 14 hours of flying time. The single example was completed as a two-seater and it first flew on 23 October 1916, and on a later flight to Western Europe it was lost in a forced landing in Romania.

The DE trimotor bomber was built with a single  Salmson 9B radial engine in the nose, and two  Le Rhone 9C rotary engines mounted as pushers, with the propellers behind the engines, and it carried four crew members, two of which manned guns at the front of the engine nacelles. A  bombload was intended, but the aircraft was  overweight and development was abandoned after the sole prototype was damaged during its first flight, on 23 June 1916.

Vassili Nikolayevich Khioni, a designer with Anatra, was responsible for the Anadva (short for Anade 2, and nicknamed , Russian for twin-tailed.) with twin fuselages, which carried a gunner in a pod on the top wing, above and between the two fuselages. The fuselages used were those of the Anade (the VKh Anadva) and the Anasal (Anadva-Salmson), but neither design was successful despite work continuing into 1921.

References

Citations

Bibliography

Aircraft manufacturers of Ukraine